Thomas Shadwell ( – 19 November 1692) was an English poet and playwright who was appointed Poet Laureate in 1689.

Life
Shadwell was born at either Bromehill Farm, Weeting-with-Broomhill or Santon House, Lynford, Norfolk, and educated at Bury St Edmunds School, and at Gonville and Caius College, Cambridge, which he entered in 1656. He left the university without a degree, and joined the Middle Temple. At the Whig triumph in 1688, he superseded John Dryden as poet laureate and historiographer royal. He died at Chelsea on 19 November 1692. He was buried in Chelsea Old Church, but his tomb was destroyed by wartime bombing. A memorial to him with a bust by Francis Bird survives in Poets' Corner in Westminster Abbey.

He was married to the actress Anne Shadwell, who appeared in several of his plays. They had four children including the playwright Charles Shadwell and John Shadwell, a physician who attended to both Queen Anne and George I.

Works
In 1668 he produced a prose comedy, The Sullen Lovers, or the Impertinents, based on Les Fâcheux by Molière, and written in open imitation of Ben Jonson's comedy of humours. His best plays are Epsom Wells (1672), for which Sir Charles Sedley wrote a prologue, and The Squire of Alsatia (1688). Alsatia was the cant name for the Whitefriars area of London, then a kind of sanctuary for persons liable to arrest, and the play represents, in dialogue full of the local argot, the adventures of a young heir who falls into the hands of the sharpers there.

For fourteen years from the production of his first comedy to his memorable encounter with John Dryden, Shadwell produced a play nearly every year. These productions display a hatred of sham, and a rough but honest moral purpose. Although bawdy, they present a vivid picture of contemporary manners.

Shadwell is chiefly remembered as the unfortunate Mac Flecknoe of Dryden's satire, the "last great prophet of tautology", and the literary son and heir of Richard Flecknoe:
"The rest to some faint meaning make pretense, 
But Shadwell never deviates into sense."

Dryden had furnished Shadwell with a prologue to his True Widow (1679) and, in spite of momentary differences, the two had been on friendly terms. But when Dryden joined the court party, and produced Absalom and Achitophel and The Medal, Shadwell became the champion of the Protestants, and made a scurrilous attack on Dryden in The Medal of John Bayes: a Satire against Folly and Knavery (1682). Dryden immediately retorted in Mac Flecknoe, or a Satire on the True Blue Protestant Poet, T.S. (1682), in which Shadwell's personalities were returned with interest. A month later he contributed to Nahum Tate's continuation of Absalom and Achitophel satirical portraits of Elkanah Settle as Doeg and of Shadwell as Og. In 1687, Shadwell attempted to answer these attacks in a version of Juvenal's 10th Satire.

However, Dryden's portrait of Shadwell in Absalom and Achitophel cut far deeper, and has withstood the test of time.  In this satire, Dryden noted of Settle and Shadwell:

Two fools that crutch their feeble sense on verse;
Who, by my muse, to all succeeding times 
Shall live, in spite of their own doggrel rhymes;   

Nonetheless, Shadwell, due to the Whig triumph in 1688, superseded his enemy as Poet Laureate and historiographer royal.

His son, Charles Shadwell was also a playwright. A scene from his play, The Stockjobbers was included as an introduction in Caryl Churchill's Serious Money (1987).

Poems

Dear Pretty Youth

Love in their little veins inspires

Nymphs and Shepherds

Bibliography
A complete edition of Shadwell's works was published by another son, Sir John Shadwell, in 1720. Thomas Shadwell's other dramatic works are:
The Sullen Lovers (1668), adapted from Molière
The Royal Shepherdess (1669), an adaptation of John Fountain's Rewards of Virtue
The Humorist (1671)
The Miser (1672), adapted from Molière
Psyche (1675)
The Libertine (1676)
The Virtuoso (1676)
The History of Timon of Athens the Man-hater (1678),--on this Shakespearian adaptation see Oscar Beber's inaugural dissertation, Thom. Shadwell's Bearbeitung des Shakespeare'schen "Timon of Athens" (Rostock, 1897)
A True Widow (1679)
The Woman Captain (1680), revived in 1744 as The Prodigal
The Lancashire Witches and Teague O'Divelly, the Irish Priest (1682)
Bury Fair (1689)
The Amorous Bigot, with the second part of Teague O'Divelly (1690)
The Scowerers (1691)
The Volunteers, or Stockjobbers, published posthumously (1693)

See also

 Restoration comedy

Notes

References

External links

 
 
 
 14 Shadwell Plays Online.

1640s births
1692 deaths
British Poets Laureate
Alumni of Gonville and Caius College, Cambridge
Members of the Green Ribbon Club
People from Norfolk
Year of birth uncertain
17th-century English dramatists and playwrights
17th-century English poets
17th-century English male writers
English male dramatists and playwrights
English male poets
Burials at Chelsea Old Church